Abramovka is a rural locality (a village) in Semyonovskoye Rural Settlement of Verkhnekhavsky District, Voronezh Oblast, Russia. The population was 3363 as of 2010. There are 30 streets.

Geography 
Abramovka is located 18 km northeast of Verkhnyaya Khava (the district's administrative centre) by road. Semyonovka is the nearest rural locality.

References 

Rural localities in Verkhnekhavsky District